Malcolm Burrows FRS (born 28 May 1943, Luton ) is a British zoologist, and emeritus professor of zoology at the University of Cambridge. His area of research specialization is in the neural control of animal behaviour particularly in those of small invertebrates. Some of his research examines the circuitry of neurons, muscles and the mechanics of joints involved in the rapid movements and leaps of insects.

Burrows matriculated at Jesus College, Cambridge in 1961, and worked on his PhD under Adrian Horridge at the Gatty Marine Laboratory. He then worked with Melvin Cohen at the University of Oregon on the strike mechanisms of mantis shrimps. He also worked with Dennis Willows on crab mouthparts and later worked on locust locomotion at the University of Oxford and at the invitation of Torkel Weis-Fogh, moved back to Cambridge. He was an editor at the Journal of Experimental Biology. He retired as Head of the department of zoology at Cambridge after 15 years in September 2010. He was awarded the Frink Medal in 2004.

He published The Neurobiology of an Insect Brain in 1996.

Works
In 2013, Burrows and Gregory Sutton described the gear mechanism used in the jumping mechanism of nymphs of the bug Issus.
 "Neural control and coordination of jumping in froghopper insects", J Neurophysiology 97:320-330
"Froghopper insects leap to new heights", Nature 42:509

References

External links
http://www.neuroscience.cam.ac.uk/directory/profile.php?mb135
https://web.archive.org/web/20120426002152/http://www.tomwood-art.com/index.aspx?sectionid=1204253&productid=1836770
On insects jumping on water
On gears in insects

British zoologists
Fellows of the Royal Society
Fellows of Wolfson College, Cambridge
Alumni of Jesus College, Cambridge
Living people
1943 births
Professors of Zoology (Cambridge, 1866)